The 1996–97 Idaho Vandals men's basketball team represented the University of Idaho during the 1996–97 NCAA Division I men's basketball season. New members of the Big West Conference, the Vandals were led by first-year head coach Kermit Davis (third overall) and played their home games on campus at the Kibbie Dome in Moscow, Idaho. 

It was the first time Idaho had missed the postseason in eighteen years.

An assistant at Idaho for two seasons under Tim Floyd, Davis was promoted to head coach in April 1988. After consecutive conference titles and NCAA appearances, he left in March 1990 for Texas A&M, but lasted only one season there.

Davis left Idaho again in April 1997 to become associate head coach at LSU in the Southeastern Conference under new head coach John Brady; Vandals' assistant David Farrar was soon promoted to head coach.

References

External links
Sports Reference – Idaho Vandals: 1996–97 basketball season
Gem of the Mountains: 1997 University of Idaho yearbook – 1996–97 basketball season
Idaho Argonaut – student newspaper – 1997 editions

Idaho Vandals men's basketball seasons
Idaho
1997 in sports in Idaho
Idaho